Sean Casey (born 9 December 1971) is an English former professional rugby league footballer who played in the 1990s and 2000s, and coached in the 2000s.

References

External links
Statistics at saints.org.uk

1971 births
Living people
English rugby league players
Place of birth missing (living people)
Rugby league centres
Rugby league locks
Rugby league players from St Helens, Merseyside
Rugby league second-rows
Rugby league wingers
St Helens R.F.C. players
Swinton Lions players
Whitehaven R.L.F.C. players